Visco may refer to:

People 
 Ignazio Visco (born 1949), Italian economist and Governor of the Bank of Italy
 Vincenzo Visco (born 1942), Italian politician and economist who has served as a government minister
 Visco Grgich (1923–2005), American National Football League player

Other uses 
 Visco, Friuli, Italy, a comune (municipality) in the province of Udine
 Visco Corporation, a video game developer
 Visco Flying Service, original name of Imperial Airlines, a defunct American commuter airline
 Visco fuse, a higher quality fuse used for consumer fireworks

See also 
 Viscos, a French commune in the Hautes-Pyrénées department